Johns River may refer to:

Rivers
Johns River (Kentucky)
Johns River (Maine)
Johns River (New Hampshire)
Johns River (North Carolina)
Johns River (Vermont)
Johns River (Washington)

Communities
Johns River, New South Wales, Australia, located in the City of Greater Taree

See also
John's River, a tributary of River Suir, Ireland
 Johns (disambiguation)
 John Rivers, a Tudor-era businessman who became Lord Mayor of London